Italian recording artist Baby K has released three studio albums, three extended plays and twenty singles (including three as a featured artist). She is mainly known for her hits "Killer", recorded with Tiziano Ferro, and "Roma-Bangkok", a duet with Giusy Ferreri, which was the best-selling single of 2015 in Italy.

Studio albums

Extended plays

Singles

As lead artist

As featured artist

Other appearances

Notes

References 

Discographies of Italian artists